Oneşti is a city in Bacău County, Romania.

Oneşti may also refer to:

Oneşti, Hînceşti, a commune in Hînceşti district, Moldova
Oneşti, Străşeni, a commune in Străşeni district, Moldova
Oneşti, a village in Plugari Commune, Iaşi County, Romania
Oneşti, a village in Zăbriceni Commune, Edineţ district, Moldova